Mela Hudson (July 24, 1987 – August 14, 2018) was an American actress, and producer best known for her roles in Split Costs, The Sisterhood of Night, Hits, Eight, and Melancholia. Hudson made her producer debut in 2013 for such films as Presence, and Resident Evil: Red Falls. Hudson died on August 14, 2018 in Burbank, California.

Personal life 

Hudson was born and raised in Poughkeepsie, New York to Michael Marinucci Jr., and Carol Ann Dalrymple. She had a brother, Michael, who is five years older, and a twin brother, Vincent. At the age of four, she belonged to the Estelle and Alfonso Performing Arts Program, and the Betty Jean Studio where she performed on stage in huge venues such as the Mid-Hudson Civic Center. She started acting at the age of eight when she was cast as the lead in her elementary school's play. She attended a private Catholic school called Holy Trinity from first grade to third grade, then finished elementary school at Brinkerhoff Elementary. She then attended Van Wyck Junior High, and then John Jay Senior High School where she continued to act on stage, as well as build sets for the productions. She graduated from high school in 2005.

Progressing to motion picture, she then studied acting at Dutchess Community College where she focused her skill in multiple student films. In 2009 she was introduced to the New York Talent Club where she started to obtain professional on-set experience working in independent films, TV commercials, and music videos that were being shot locally. She has trained professionally at the John Pallotta Studio of Acting, and Jordan Bayne's Permission Playground in New York City. Hudson is most proud of learning from the Dustin Hoffman, and Kevin Spacey in their Masterclasses.

Career 

Hudson starred in the multi-award winning short film, Split Costs, written and directed by Jeffrey B. Palmer. The film premiered at the 2016 Bluestocking Film Festival in Portland, Maine, where it received an Audience Choice Award. Since then, the film has received 15 awards, and has 14 nominations, including Hudson's 3 wins, and 3 nominations.

Hudson directed and appeared in commercials and music videos, such as Deborah Harry's music video for "Mother".

Hudson appeared in David Cross' film Hits which premiered at Sundance Film Festival in 2014.

In October 2014, Hudson announced that she was creating her first animation film, Tomboy. She had written it as a short story at first, but then soon after decided to adapt it to screen.

Philanthropy 
In September 2016 Hudson started volunteering her time monthly with the Play For Your Freedom an organization focused on helping veterans suffering from PTSD through wellness workshops. In an interview she said, "These things have always been important to me in my life. It is important that we use our position to do good in the world." Some of Hudson's charities include those devoted to fighting hunger, domestic violence, and suicide prevention.

Filmography

Television

Producer

Director / Screenwriter

Awards

Accolades 

Hudson started to gain recognition after playing Emma in the short film, Split Costs, in which she received three awards in the categories: Award of Merit for Leading Actress at the Best Shorts Competition (September 2016), Best Actress at the Women's Only Entertainment Film Festival (July 2016), and shared Best Ensemble Performance with Tori Hall, Jane Harte, and Lauren Kirby at the Stories by the River Film Festival (January 2017). She also received three nominations in the categories: Best Actress at the North American Film Awards (January 2017), Best Actress in a Short Film at the Hudson Valley International Film Festival (August 2016), and a SOFIE Award for Best Actress at the Short Film Awards (December 2016). She has also won a People's Choice Award at the Coleman Awards (September 2012), out of seventy-five nominees nationwide, and Best Supporting Broad at the Broad Humor Awards (July 2015). and was nominated for Best Actress in Social Media at the Shorty Awards.

References

External links 

1987 births
2018 deaths
21st-century American actresses
American female models
American film actresses
Philanthropists from New York (state)
American television actresses
People from Poughkeepsie, New York
20th-century American philanthropists
20th-century American women
Dutchess Community College alumni